ETAPA (Empresa de Telecomunicaciones, Agua Potable, Alcantarillado y saneamiento de Cuenca) is a public utilities company owned and operated by the city of Cuenca, Ecuador.  The company provides landline telephone, internet, water, and sewage services within the canton of Cuenca.

Etapatelecom
Etapatelecom was spun off as a private company from ETAPA in 2002 so that it could sell telecommunications services across Ecuador, not just in Cuenca. The company expanded into other cities such as Quito and Guayaquil; however, the business plan was unsuccessful and by 2009 Etapatelecom had generated US$10 million dollars in losses. The company was merged back into ETAPA in 2010 where it now operates as a business unit.

References

External links

Internet service providers of Ecuador